Himella is an insect genus of the family Coreidae, or leaf-footed bugs, from South America.

Species
 Himella incaica Brailovsky & Barrera, 1986
 Himella paramerana Brailovsky & Barrera, 1986
 Himella venosa Dallas, 1852

References 

Nematopodini
Coreidae genera